Pelle Dragsted (born 13 April 1975 in Copenhagen) is a Danish author and politician, who has been a member of the Folketing for the Red-Green Alliance since the 2022 Danish general election. He formerly served as member of the Folketing in 2015 to 2019.

He has been described as the Danish left's unofficial chief ideologue and as the Red-Green Alliance's grey eminence.

Dragsted was elected to the Frederiksberg City Council in 2021 where he serves as chair of the climate and housing committee. After winning re-election to the Folketing, Dragsted stepped back from his position as councilor due to rules regarding double mandates in the Red-Green alliance.

Career
From 2009 to 2011, Dragsted was in charge of the press work for the Red-Green Alliance. From 2011 to 2015 he was a political advisor for the party. Dragsted was first elected into parliament at the 2015 Danish general election, where he received 2,599	votes. He was a state accountant in 2021.

In 2021 Dragsted published the book Nordisk socialism (Nordic socialism) for which he was awarded the N.F.S. Grundtvig Prize.

Dragsted was again elected to the Folketing in 2022 receiving 14,129 votes. In the days following the election, Dragsted participated in government formation negotiations with Mette Frederiksen alongside Mai Villadsen and Peder Hvelplund. On 15 November 2022, Dragsted officially became part of the Red-Green alliances collective leadership.

Bibliography
Nordisk socialisme (Gyldendal, 2021)

References

External links 
 Biography on the website of the Danish Parliament (Folketinget)

Living people
1975 births
People from Copenhagen
Red–Green Alliance (Denmark) politicians
Danish writers
Members of the Folketing 2015–2019
Members of the Folketing 2022–2026